TIDEL Park Coimbatore is an information technology (IT) park in Coimbatore, India. It was set up in 2006 to foster the growth of information technology in other districts of Tamil Nadu by TIDEL Park Ltd, a joint venture of Tamil Nadu Industrial Development Corporation (TIDCO) and Electronics Corporation of Tamil Nadu (ELCOT). The name TIDEL is a portmanteau of TIDCO and ELCOT and also named after TIDEL Park at Chennai. It is the country's largest single building IT park in terms of built up area.

Location 

The ELCOT SEZ is around 63 acres, already land allotted to below list of companies.

 Wipro Limited - 9.5 acres SEZ Campus Operational
 TIDEL Park, Coimbatore - 9.5 acres SEZ Campus Operational
 Tata Consultancy Services - 9.5 acres Land allotted in SEZ
 HCL Technologies - 5 acres Land allotted in SEZ
 ELCOT IT Park- 2.42 acres SEZ Campus [Set to Open in Jan-2023]

List of Companies in TIDEL Park, Coimbatore

1. Accenture

2. Bosch

3. IBM 

4.  Infosys

5.  State Street HCL Services

6.  Tech Mahindra 

7.  Mindtree  

8.  Payoda Technologies 

9.  Access Healthcare Services

10. Cameron Manufacturing India Pvt Ltd

11. Brillersys

12. ASEC

13. Visionet Systems Pvt Ltd

14. KMIT Solutions

15. Toppan Merrill Technology Services

16. Kavin Engineering and Services Private Limited

17. S & T Interiors and Contracting (India) Private Limited

18. Soliton Technologies

19.Exterro R&D Private Limited 

20. NEXT Techno Inc

21. Indmax IT services

22. ZAN CompuTech INDIA Pvt Ltd

23. Envision Software Engineering

24. Vensars Technologies

25. Visionary RCM InfoTech Pvt Ltd

26. eBIDI Solutions

27. KM Medical Software Solution

28. Kovai Systems (biztalk360)

29. i2 Software Tech Solutions Pvt Ltd

30. Infognana Solutions

31. Creosen Services

32. Atom8 IT solutions

33. PurpleRain

34. Tuxfield Technologies

35. Bling Faith Evoutions

36. Happlo

37. HashTag Technologies

38. Texila American University & Management

39. Adroit Technologies

40. Wezkoz Consulting Co

41. Prologig Business Services

42. GreenOrange Information Technology Private Limited

43. Kovan Labs

44. K.L.R Technologies

45. Information Evolution India Private Limited

46. Corpuslabs Solutions Private Limited

47. Walinns Innovation

48. Unilogic Technologies

49. Appviewx

50. Technosoft Global service PVT

51. Cloud assert

52. Quintessence Business Solutions & Services

53. GDKN Technologies India

54. Deevol (OPC)

55. State Bank of India

56. Aarbee Structures Pvt Ltd

57. Comprehend IT Solutions

58. Mongrov

59. Bright Bridge Infotech

60. UBX Cloud

61. Effitrac Solutions India Pvt Ltd

62. A.G Resources / Personiv

63. Kanini

64. Shlok labs technologies

65. Interbind technologies

66.  Owler

67. Omega Healthcare

68. India Post

References

Economy of Coimbatore
Science parks in India
Software technology parks in India
Science and technology in Tamil Nadu